Jack Veneno (born Rafael Antonio Sánchez; May 2, 1942 – April 6, 2021) was a Dominican professional wrestler and politician.

Professional wrestling career
He became interested in wrestling as a teen, watching the Mexican luchador El Santo. Also known as "El hijo de Doña Tatica" (Mrs. Tatica's Son), he worked for many years on Color Visión channel 9 during the 1970s, 1980s and 1990s, on a wrestling show called Lucha Libre Internacional.  He was the main star of the show as well as the owner of the production company Dominicana de Espectaculos.

On September 7, 1982, Veneno challenged Ric Flair for the NWA World Heavyweight Championship in Santo Domingo. The match ended when Veneno applied his signature sleeper hold to Flair, with the bell ringing to signify the expiration of the match's time limit as Flair's arm dropped for a third time. The fans then celebrated Veneno "winning" the NWA World Heavyweight Championship. The title change was not recognized by the National Wrestling Alliance. Flair reportedly instructed Veneno to defeat him due to fears of the audience in the oversold stadium turning violent if the popular Veneno lost. In the Dominican Republic, Veneno was reported to have surrendered the title back to Flair due to not being willing to leave the country to defend it.

Veneno retired himself in 2000.

In 2007 a trailer for a documentary featuring the lost footage of his match with Flair aired throughout the Dominican Republic, but was not released at that time. In April 2015 the documentary was finally released on the internet for free, and shows the only footage known to exist of the famous match, the film "Jack; La Historia de Jack Veneno" features Jack and others discussing his career and life. The film was produced by Benjamin Irish, a protege of Veneno, and is widely attributed to Veneno's resurgence of celebrity in the country after 2007.

Political career 
Although retired from wrestling, Veneno ran for Mayor of Santo Domingo Norte, one of the Santo Domingo Province municipalities, on the 2006 Congressional and Municipal Elections with the Institutional Social Democratic Bloc party. In 2007, he was appointed by the Dominican Republic president Leonel Fernández as Vice-Minister of Sports.

Legacy and death 

A movie trilogy about Veneno's life is planned; the first part was released in 2018.

On April 13, 2019, a statue was unveiled in Veneno's honor in the Eugenio María de Hostos Park in Santo Domingo.

On April 6, 2021, Veneno died from pancreatic cancer, which had metastasized to his lungs. He was 78 years old.

Championships and accomplishments 
 Dominicana de Espectaculos
 Light Heavyweight Championship (6 times)
 Intercontinental Heavyweight Championship (2 times) 
 World Tag Team Championship (8 times) - with Puño De Hierro (2 times), El Caballero Negro (2 times), Mr. Haiti (1 time), Maravilla (1 time), and Raffy Sanchez (1 time) 
Dominican Wrestling Federation
 DWF Caribbean Tag Team Championship (1 time) - with Relámpago Hernández
 DWF Dominican Republic Heavyweight Championship (6 times) 
 Served as Vice-Minister of Sports (2007-2012)
 National Welterweight Championship (1 time) 
 National Wrestling Alliance
 NWA World Heavyweight Championship (1 time)1 
 World Wrestling Council
 WWC North American Tag-Team Championship (1 times) - with José Rivera

1  Veneno's reign is not recognized by the National Wrestling Alliance.

References

External links 
 
 

1942 births
Dominican Republic politicians
Dominican Republic male professional wrestlers
2021 deaths
NWA World Heavyweight Champions
Social Democratic Institutional Bloc politicians